Grandfalls is a town in Ward County, Texas, United States. Early settlers were attracted to the Grandfalls area in the late 1880s by the steady supply of water flowing in the Pecos River. Its population was 360 at the 2010 census.

Geography

Grandfalls is located at  (31.340779, –102.854785).

According to the United States Census Bureau, the town has a total area of 0.5 square miles (1.4 km2), all of it land.

Demographics

2020 census

As of the 2020 United States census, there were 340 people, 129 households, and 99 families residing in the town.

2000 census
As of the census of 2000, 391 people, 146 households, and 100 families resided in the town. The population density was 729.1 people per square mile (279.6/km2). The 203 housing units averaged 378.5 per square mile (145.1/km2). The racial makeup of the town was 71.10% White, 0.26% African American, 1.28% Native American, 25.32% from other races, and 2.05% from two or more races. Hispanics or Latinos of any race were 49.87% of the population.

Of the 146 households, 43.2% had children under the age of 18 living with them, 51.4% were married couples living together, 13.0% had a female householder with no husband present, and 31.5% were not families. About 29.5% of all households were made up of individuals, and 14.4% had someone living alone who was 65 years of age or older. The average household size was 2.68 and the average family size was 3.34.

In the town, the population was distributed as 33.2% under the age of 18, 7.2% from 18 to 24, 26.6% from 25 to 44, 18.9% from 45 to 64, and 14.1% who were 65 years of age or older. The median age was 34 years. For every 100 females, there were 81.9 males. For every 100 females age 18 and over, there were 69.5 males.

The median income for a household in the town was $19,583, and for a family was $27,250. Males had a median income of $27,000 versus $12,188 for females. The per capita income for the town was $10,524. About 24.1% of families and 24.1% of the population were below the poverty line, including 28.3% of those under age 18 and 28.1% of those age 65 or over.

Education and sports
The town of Grandfalls is served by the Grandfalls-Royalty Independent School District.  In 2013, the Grandfalls-Royalty Cowboys won the U.I.L. 1A Division 2 sixman football state championship.

Climate
This area has a large amount of sunshine year round due to its stable descending air and high pressure.  According to the Köppen climate classification system, Grandfalls has a desert climate, Bwh on climate maps.

Notable people

 Norman Lawrence Cox (1925–2008), was an American football quarterback who played two seasons with the Chicago Rockets of the All-America Football Conference; he attended  Grandfalls-Royalty High School
 W. E. "Pete" Snelson, journalist turned businessman and member of both houses of the Texas State Legislature, was born in Grandfalls in 1923

References

Towns in Texas
Towns in Ward County, Texas